Kyneburga, Kyneswide and Tibba were female members of the Mercian royal family in 7th century England who were venerated as saints.

Kyneburga and Kyneswide
Kyneburga (d. c. 680) (also called Cyneburh in Old English); the name being also rendered as Kinborough and in occasional use as a Christian name) and Kyneswide (Cyneswitha) were sisters, the daughters of King Penda of Mercia (who remained true to Anglo-Saxon paganism). She was eldest daughter of Penda. Although her father was an opponent of Christianity, she and all her siblings converted.
Bede wrote that Penda tolerated the preaching of Christianity in Mercia itself, despite his own beliefs:
"Nor did King Penda obstruct the preaching of the word among his people, the Mercians, if any were willing to hear it; but, on the contrary, he hated and despised those whom he perceived not to perform the works of faith, when they had once received the faith, saying, They were contemptible and wretched who did not obey their God, in whom they believed.
This was begun two years before the death of King Penda. Their mother was Queen Cyneswise. Tibba is believed to have been a relative.

Kyneburga married Alhfrith of Deira, co-regent of Northumbria (who attended the Synod of Whitby in 664),  and later founded an abbey for both monks and nuns in Castor, in the Soke of Peterborough. She became  the first abbess and was later joined by Kyneswide and Tibba. Kyneswide succeeded Kyneburga as abbess and she was later succeeded by Tibba. She was buried in her church, but the remains of Kyneburga and Kyneswide were translated, before 972, to Peterborough Abbey, now Peterborough Cathedral.

Kyneburga had been one of the signatories, together with her brother Wulfhere, of the founding charter of Burh Abbey, dated 664, per William Dugdale's Monasticon. (Burh Abbey was later dedicated to St Peter, becoming "Peterborough"). She was much esteemed as a saint by the monks of Peterborough, and features as one of the saints remembered annually on 6 March in several ancient Peterborough-produced Kalendars, (a section of  a psalter).

She died on 15 September AD 680 and was buried at Castor where she soon became revered as a saint. In 963 her body was moved to Peterborough, with those of her sister, Cuneswitha, and their kins woman, Tibba. Her remains were transferred to Thorney Abbey some time later. Her feast day is celebrated on 6 March.

She is remembered in a chapel at Peterborough Cathedral, the 12th century St Kyneburga's parish church in Castor, Lady Conyburrow's Way (a ridge in a field near Castor), Kimberwell spring, Bedfordshire, the villages of Kimberley, Norfolk and West Yorkshire.

There was another lady by the name of Kyneburg, the wife of Oswald of Northumbria.

Tibba
Tibba, patron saint of falconers, is believed to have lived at Ryhall, Rutland, in the 7th century. She was buried there, but in the 11th century her relics were translated to Peterborough Abbey, by Abbot Ælfsige (1006–1042). According to legend, St Tibba was a niece of King Penda.  The remains of a small hermitage associated with the saint can be seen on the west side of the north aisle of Ryhall church.

There was at Ryhall a shrine and a holy well dedicated to Saint Tibba. Robert Charles Hope placed the location on the brow of Tibbal's Hill (Tibb's-well-hill), "upon the hill going from Tolethorpe to Belmsford Bridge".

Tibba had a cousin Eabba, who lived with her. Hope suggests the holy well dedicated to her was just north of Tibba's, on the other side of a ford of the River Gwash and the name "St. Eabba's-well-ford was corrupted to Stableford when a bridge was later built there. St. Eabba's well came to be called by local shepherds "Jacob's well". (For the relationship between St Tibba and St Ebba ("Domne Eafe"), see e.g. Rollason, D.W., The Mildrith Legend A Study in Early Medieval Hagiography in England, Leicester University Press, 1982, p. 77)

Translation
Originally buried at Castor and Ryhall, their relics were bought in the 10th century by Peterborough Abbey under the direction of  Abbot Aelfsige of Peterborough, as part of a policy of relic acquisition by the abbey. Their relics at the abbey were lost or destroyed in the Reformation.

References

Bibliography
 Dunbar, Agnes (1904) A Dictionary of Saintly Women. 2 vols. London: Bell, 1904–1905.

External links
Castor Church - The Life of St Kyneburgha

Mercian saints
Anglo-Saxon abbesses
7th-century Christian saints
Anglo-Saxon nuns
Trios
House of Icel
Burials at Peterborough Cathedral
Female saints of medieval England
7th-century English nuns